Michael Muggivan (1887–1971) was an Australian professional rugby league footballer who played in 1910s.

Playing career
Muggivan played for Glebe for three seasons between 1910 and 1912. 

He made one representative appearance for Metropolis (Sydney) in 1911. Sydney Beat Country 29–8 and Mick Muggivan scored an excellent try in the match played on 10 June 1911. 

Muggivan played with other notable players in the Sydney Team such as Frank Burge, Mick Frawley and Ray Norman.  Muggivan moved to Brisbane, Queensland in the 1930s and died there in 1971.

References

Glebe rugby league players
Australian rugby league players
1887 births
1971 deaths
Place of birth missing
Rugby league wingers
Rugby league centres
Rugby league five-eighths